So Fresh: The Hits of Autumn 2010 is an Australian compilation album. The album was released on 19 March 2010.

CD
Owl City – "Fireflies" (3:48)
Kesha featuring 3OH!3 – "Blah Blah Blah" (2:52)
Jay Sean featuring Sean Paul and Lil Jon – "Do You Remember" (3:31)
Lady Gaga – "Bad Romance" (4:00)
Rihanna – "Russian Roulette" (3:46)
Stan Walker – "Black Box" (3:28)
Justin Bieber – "One Time" (3:36)
Richard Vission and Static Revenger featuring Luciana – "I Like That" (2:23)
Guy Sebastian – "All to Myself" (4:32)
The Black Eyed Peas – "Rock That Body" (4:00)
Pink – "Ave Mary A" (3:16)
La Roux – "Quicksand" (3:06)
Powderfinger – "Burn Your Name" (3:52)
Florence and the Machine – "You've Got the Love" (2:46)
Chris Brown – "Crawl" (3:57)
Natalie Bassingthwaighte  – "Love Like This" (3:54)
Gossip – "Pop Goes the World" (3:25)
Calvin Harris – "Flashback" (3:47)
Adam Lambert – "Whataya Want from Me" (3:47)
Passion Pit – "Little Secrets" (3:59)

DVD
Owl City – "Fireflies"
Jay Sean featuring Sean Paul and Lil Jon – "Do You Remember"
Lady Gaga – "Bad Romance"
Rihanna – "Russian Roulette"
Stan Walker – "Black Box"
Justin Bieber – "One Time"
Richard Vission and Static Revenger featuring Luciana – "I Like That"
Guy Sebastian – "All to Myself"
Florence and the Machine - "You've Got the Love"
Chris Brown – "Crawl"
Natalie Bassingthwaighte  – "Love Like This"
Calvin Harris – "Flashback"
Adam Lambert – "Whataya Want from Me"

Charts

Year-end charts

Certifications

References 

So Fresh albums
2010 compilation albums
2010 in Australian music